Panposh is a census town in Sundargarh district in the Indian state of Odisha.It is a part of Rourkela City.

Demographics
 India census, Panposh had a population of 10,227. Males constitute 51% of the population and females 49%. Panposh has an average literacy rate of 67%, higher than the national average of 59.5%: male literacy is 74%, and female literacy is 61%. In Panposh, 12% of the population is under 6 years of age.

Transport
Panposh is a station on the Tatanagar–Bilaspur section of Howrah-Nagpur-Mumbai line.

References

Cities and towns in Sundergarh district